Sidneya is a genus of flowering plants belonging to the family Asteraceae.

Its native range is southern central USA (in the states of New Mexico and Texas) to Mexico and El Salvador. 

The genus name of Sidneya is in honour of Sidney Fay Blake (1892–1959), an American botanist and plant taxonomist. 
It was first described and published in Bot. J. Linn. Soc. Vol.167 on page 327 in 2011.

Known species
According to Kew:
Sidneya pinnatilobata 
Sidneya tenuifolia

References

Asteraceae
Asteraceae genera
Plants described in 2011
Flora of the South-Central United States
Flora of Mexico
Flora of El Salvador